This is a partial list of country houses in Staffordshire that have been demolished:-

 Alton Towers. Demolished 1952.
 Beaudesert. Demolished 1936.
 Bentley Hall. Demolished 1929.
 Canwell Hall. Demolished 1950s. 
 Drayton Manor. Demolished 1929.
 Elford Hall. Demolished 1964.
 Elmhurst Hall. Demolished 1921.
 Fisherwick Hall. Demolished 1808.
 Hints Hall. Demolished 1952.
 Manley Hall. Demolished 1961.
 Shenstone Court. Demolished 1930s.
 Teddesley Hall. Demolished 1954
 Tixall Hall. Demolished 1927.
 Trentham Hall. Demolished 1911.
 Wolseley Hall. Demolished 1950s/1966.

 Staffordshire
Houses in Staffordshire
History of Staffordshire
Lost houses of Staffordshire